CityJet is an Irish regional airline with headquarters in Swords, Dublin. It was founded in 1992 and has gone through a series of corporate structures. Air France sold CityJet to Intro Aviation in May 2014; in March 2016 the airline was bought by founder Pat Byrne and other investors. Since 2017, CityJet had moved away from scheduled flights and has instead focused on wet leasing and charter flights. As of August 2020, the airline operates wet-lease services on behalf of Scandinavian Airlines.

History

Early years

Cityjet was founded in 1992 as Business City Direct and commenced operations in January 1994, serving a single route between Dublin and London City Airport under a franchise agreement with Virgin Atlantic, in which it paid fees and charges to Virgin in order to operate as Virgin Cityjet and use Virgin Atlantic' distribution channels. The airline was mainly competing with British Midland and Aer Lingus services from Dublin to London Heathrow and Ryanair services from Dublin to London Stansted. However, Cityjet held a monopoly on services to London City until Aer Lingus launched services from Dublin to London City in September 1999.

In June 1995, Virgin Cityjet debuted with flights between Dublin and Brussels, competing with Sabena and Aer Lingus initially.

In 1996, the airline terminated its franchise agreement with Virgin Atlantic on short notice and decided to continue operations using its own CityJet name from the end of July that year. By then, the airline flew scheduled flights from Dublin to London City, Brussels and Malaga. The decision to discontinue the Virgin Atlantic franchise came as Virgin itself entered the European short-haul market with budget carrier Virgin Express, and CityJet feared customers could confuse the low-cost carrier with its own full-service operation.

Air France era

In 1999, Cityjet was at the verge of bankruptcy. Air Foyle acquired half of the shares in the airline in return for assuming the carrier's debts. Air France took another 25 percent while investing £2 million. Under the new structure, Cityjet retained its own scheduled services while also becoming Air France's principal European subcontract airline. However, Cityjet still remained a loss-making business. 
   
In early 2000, Air France took over all shares in CityJet and became its sole owner. At the time, Cityjet already operated seven out of eight of its aircraft for Air France. The French national airline was allowed to outsource operations of aircraft with less than 100 seats to regional partners and subsidiaries under its contracts with Air France' labour unions; overall savings to Air France by outsourcing regional operations to the Irish subsidiary were estimated at around 40 percent. 

In 2006, Cityjet operated supplemented Air France's operations with flights from Paris to Dublin, Birmingham, Edinburgh, London City, Florence, Gothenburg and Zurich. Furthermore, the airline still operated between London City and Dublin. The fleet consisted of 20 aged BAe 146 aircraft. From December 2006, the airline began replacing them with 23 much younger but similar Avro RJ85s it had acquired in a $221 million deal from Mesaba Airlines.

On 24 December 2007, Air France-KLM announced that it had signed an agreement for a full takeover of VLM Airlines NV from Panta Holdings, and announced on 28 May 2009 that VLM Airlines would gradually start to operate under the brand name CityJet. As of 1 June 2010, the whole VLM Airlines Fokker 50 fleet wore full CityJet livery, although VLM remained the owner of its own Airline Operators Certificate, and the Fokker 50 fleet was listed on the Belgian registry.

CityJet filed a pretax loss of €51.5 million for the year to the end of March 2010. This compared to a €53.9 million loss in the year to end March 2009. Revenues fell by 8 percent from €282.4 million to €258.9 million over the same period. Passenger numbers grew, climbing by 6.5 percent to 2.1 million, while average fares dropped by 16 percent. Christine Ourmières joined as new chief executive on 1 October 2010. She has previously held a number of senior posts within the Air France-KLM group. In the IATA year ending 31 March 2010, CityJet carried just over 1 million passengers on its London City network.

Latest developments

In June 2012 it was announced that Air France-KLM was considering selling CityJet to support its own ailing business, with a further statement in April 2013 that the winning bidder would be announced in the summer of 2013.

As of October 2013 the operational agreement with Air France has been replaced by codesharing. CityJet since then operated most routes under its own WX code instead of Air France's. In December 2013 Air France announced it would sell CityJet, including VLM Airlines, to German investor Intro Aviation. The transfer was completed in May 2014. CityJet subsidiary VLM Airlines was bought by its own management and cut itself loose from CityJet. However, they were to remain flying routes as ACMI operator for CityJet until at least Summer 2015.

In 2014, CityJet started a new codeshare with Guernsey based airline Blue Islands, after Blue Islands pulled out of selected European routes. Blue Islands would operate flights from Jersey to London City, and then passengers would get onto a CityJet operated flight to a European destination. This ended in March 2016. It was announced in November 2014 that CityJet routes from Cardiff to Edinburgh and Paris-Orly were to be operated by Stobart Air from 1 December 2014. Both routes ceased in June 2015 when Flybe introduced flights on the same routes from Cardiff, supported by the airport's operator.

In June 2015, CityJet announced the termination of flights to Dresden, the last of four German destinations, due to low demand. In October 2015, Scandinavian Airlines (SAS) announced it would sell its Finnish subsidiary Blue1 to CityJet, who planned to continue to operate the company on behalf of SAS as part of a larger co-operation. In 2016 Blue1 was dissolved and merged into its parent CityJet.

On 28 June 2016, CityJet inaugurated its Sukhoi Superjet 100 revenue services with its first scheduled flight from Cork to Nantes. In early December 2016, CityJet started recruiting flight & cabin crew for a new Sukhoi Superjet 100 base in Brussels, Belgium.

In January 2017, CityJet agreed to buy Cimber, which had a fleet of 11 CRJ900s, from SAS. CityJet continued to operate flights on behalf of SAS. In March 2017, CityJet stated that it planned to focus more on its wetlease business while reducing its own scheduled flights. This led to the closure of routes from London-City to Nantes and Paris as well as a downgrade of frequencies on other routes. CityJet then planned to operate 80 percent of all flights on a wetlease basis. On 5 April 2017, it was announced that KLM Cityhopper would wet lease two Avro RJ85s from CityJet to operate four additional Amsterdam–London City services per weekday over the Summer 2017 season, starting 15 May 2017. This agreement has since ceased. In late October 2017, CityJet cancelled most of its remaining routes from London City Airport, leaving Dublin as its only scheduled destinations from there after operating a much larger network in previous years.

In July 2018, it was announced that CityJet and Air Nostrum would merge. In late August 2018, CityJet announced they would cease operating scheduled services under their own brand, effective from 27 October 2018, but continue business as an ACMI leasing provider. The London–City to Dublin route was transferred to Aer Lingus, operated by CityJet using two Avro RJ85 aircraft.

In 2019, CityJet pulled all Sukhoi Superjet 100 aircraft from service due to insufficient operational reliability and returned them to their lessor. For the same reason a wetlease agreement with Brussels Airlines fell through.

In 2019, Cityjet partnered with KLM to create Air Antwerp, a new airline based in Antwerp International Airport. It operated daily flights to London City Airport from 9th September 2019 but ceased operations in June 2021.

In April 2020, Brussels Airlines cancelled its wetlease contract with CityJet for five aircraft in the wake of the COVID-19 pandemic. In the same month the High Court appointed an interim examiner to CityJet.

In May 2021 CityJet handed its 75% share of Air Antwerp over to co-owner KLM.

Destinations

CityJet ceased scheduled operations under its own name in October 2018, but continues to operate several routes on wetlease contracts for Scandinavian Airlines.

Fleet

Current fleet
, the CityJet fleet consists of the following aircraft:

Historic fleet 
The airline has previously operated BAE146/Avro RJ85, Fokker 50, Saab 2000, and Sukhoi Superjet 100 aircraft.

Sponsorships
 CityJet was the 'Official Airline' of Leinster Rugby.

See also
 Transport in Ireland

References

Citations

Bibliography
 Fuelled by Belief: The CityJet Story by Pat Byrne, first printed September 2004 – 
 Perry, Dominic. "Air France continues review of CityJet's future." Flightglobal. 31 October 2012.

External links

Air France–KLM
Airlines established in 1992
Airlines of the Republic of Ireland
Irish brands
European Regions Airline Association
SkyTeam affiliate members
Irish companies established in 1992
Companies based in Swords, Dublin